Kayadibikavlak is a village in the Bartın District, Bartın Province, Turkey. Its population is 526 (2021).

References

Villages in Bartın District